The Future Business Leaders of America, or FBLA, is an American career and technical student organization headquartered in Reston, Virginia. Established in 1940, FBLA is a non-profit organization of high school ("FBLA"), Middle Level ("FBLA Middle Level"), and college ("FBLA Collegiate”) students, as well as professional members ("FBLA Network"), who primarily help students transition to the business world. FBLA is one of the largest student organizations in the United States, with 253,365 members, and the largest career student organization in the world. Local FBLA chapters are often connected to their school's business education department, and most advisers are business education teachers. It is one of the top 10 organizations listed by the U.S. Department of Education. FBLA's national charity partner is the March of Dimes, and the March of Dimes provides grants of $1,000 for local chapters and $2,500 for state chapters to promote their goals.

History

FBLA was created by Hamden L. Forkner Sr. of Columbia University. Forkner, who also created the Forkner shorthand system, proposed that there should be one national organization to join the business clubs throughout the nation. The name "Future Business Leaders of America" was selected in 1940 and two years later the first chapter was created at Science Hill High School in Johnson City, Tennessee. In 1958, PBL (now FBLA Collegiate) is founded with the first chapter at the University of Northern Iowa and in 1979 the Alumni Division (now FBLA Network) was founded.

Key milestones 
 1940: FBLA was established.
 1942: First FBLA chapter is experimentally chartered at Science Hill High School, Johnson City, Tennessee.
 1958: Phi Beta Lambda, the postsecondary division of FBLA, is created.
 1969: Granted independent status as a nonprofit educational student association.
 1973: Edward D. Miller becomes FBLA's first full-time Executive Director.
 1981: The Conrad N. Hilton Foundation gifts 1.6 acres of land to FBLA-PBL to build the National Center in Reston, VA.
 1987: National Membership surpasses 200,000.
 1991: The FBLA National Center is opened.
 1994: FBLA-Middle Level formed for students Grades 5-9.
 1997: Jean Buckley appointed President and CEO.
 2019: Alexander T. Graham appointed President and CEO of FBLA-PBL.
 2022: A new logo is released and Phi Beta Lambda is renamed to FBLA Collegiate.

Governance

The organization is governed by its board of directors, which consists of the CEO, business leaders, state educators, business education teachers, and the two division national presidents.

FBLA's membership is represented by the FBLA Middle School, FBLA High School and FBLA Collegiate divisions. FBLA High School and FBLA Collegiate each have different member-elected national officer teams. The national officers are elected by voting delegates at the annual National Leadership Conference (NLC) and installed during the Awards of Excellence Program.

The FBLA High School officer team consists of a president, secretary, treasurer, parliamentarian, and five vice presidents representing each region. The FBLA Collegiate officer teams consist of a president, executive vice president, vice president of communication, vice president of financial development, vice president of membership, and parliamentarian. FBLA Collegiate is not segmented regionally.

FBLA Middle School and FBLA High School divide the United States into five administrative regions. These regions are Western, Mountain Plains, North Central, Southern, and Eastern.

Each state has what is called a State Chapter, which has its own State Officer Team. The roles in each State Officer Team vary by state, but each usually consists of a President, Vice President, Secretary, Treasurer, and Parliamentarian. Some also have Historians, Webmasters, and Reporters.
Some states are then divided into regions, districts, or areas. These are often governed by an elected official who serves on the State Officer Team. Just like the national regional executive boards, there are small-scale boards in most regions, districts, and/or areas in most states.

Finally, each chapter has its own officer team. Chapter offices vary by chapter. While most use a structure similar to that of the national officers, others use a corporate-style structure with offices such as CEO, CIO, etc. More information can be found on the national FBLA website.

Structure
Future Business Leaders of America is one of the largest student organizations in the United States. FBLA is composed of four divisions: FBLA Middle School, FBLA High School, FBLA Collegiate, and FBLA Network. Each academic division except for FBLA Middle School (the FBLA High School National Officers also represent FBLA Middle School) has their own National Officer team. Most states have an FBLA High School and FBLA Collegiate state officer team. Some states have FBLA Middle School state officer teams. The entire organization contains more than 250,000 members across the four divisions.

FBLA High School 
FBLA High School is the largest division of FBLA with over 209,000 members. FBLA High School is separated into five regions: Eastern, Southern, North Central, Mountain Plains and Western. International chapters are part of the Eastern Region. To charter an FBLA state chapter, a state must have at least five local chapters.

FBLA Collegiate 
FBLA Collegiate is the collegiate division of FBLA with about 10,000 members. FBLA Collegiate can be found in traditional four year colleges, community colleges and career training programs. FBLA Collegiate has their own National Leadership Conference (NLC) prior to FBLA Middle School and FBLA High School's NLC. To charter an FBLA Collegiate state chapter, a state must have at least three local chapters.

National officers
FBLA High School elects their nine national officers, and FBLA Collegiate elects their six national officers at each summer's national leadership conference. National officers are responsible for representing the entire membership as well as designing and implementing the annual program of work to achieve FBLA's goals. Each national officer team serves for a one-year term.

Current FBLA national officers
President – Aarav Dagar (Florida)
Secretary – Alexandria Torbert (Alabama)
Treasurer – Noah Killeen (Arizona)
Parliamentarian – Lyria Zhu (California)
Eastern Region vice president – Krisha Patel (New Jersey)
Mountain Plains Region vice president – Sophia Weber (Kansas)
North Central Region vice president – Natalie Coon (Wisconsin)
Southern Region vice president – Deborah Jacklin (Georgia)
Western Region vice president – Steven Segawa (California)

Current FBLA-Collegiate national officers
President – Madison Kraemer (Iowa)
Executive vice president – Madelaine Benowitz (New Jersey)
Vice president of communications – Shanna Shakespear (Utah)
Vice president of membership – Kimberly Speece (Pennsylvania)
Vice president of financial development – James Hulce (Wisconsin)
Parliamentarian - Toby Neal (North Carolina)

References

External links

Career and technical student organizations
Student organizations established in 1940
Non-profit organizations based in Reston, Virginia
Reston, Virginia
1940 establishments in Tennessee